Valeriy Volodymyrovych Kucherov (born 11 August 1993) is a Ukrainian professional football midfielder who plays for Veres Rivne.

Career

Club
Kucherov is a product of the FC Stal Alchevsk youth team system. In 2013, he signed a contract with FC Stal Dniprodzerzhynsk.

Kucherov made his debut in the Ukrainian Premier League for FC Stal in a game against FC Dynamo Kyiv on 19 July 2015.

In January 2018, Kucherov went on trial with Tajik League Champions Istiklol.

References

External links
 
 

1993 births
Living people
People from Stakhanov, Ukraine
Ukrainian footballers
FC Stal Alchevsk players
Ukrainian Premier League players
Ukrainian First League players
Ukrainian Second League players
FC Stal Kamianske players
Association football midfielders
NK Veres Rivne players
FC Arsenal Kyiv players
FC Kalush players
Sportspeople from Luhansk Oblast